The Linzer torte is a traditional Austrian pastry, a form of shortbread topped with fruit preserves and sliced nuts with a lattice  design on top. It is named after the city of Linz, Austria.

Linzer torte is a very short, crumbly pastry made of flour, unsalted butter, egg yolks, lemon zest, cinnamon and lemon juice, and ground nuts, usually hazelnuts, but even walnuts or almonds are used, covered with a filling of redcurrant, raspberry, or apricot preserves. Unlike most tortes, it is typically single layered like a pie or tart. It is covered by a lattice of thin dough strips placed atop the fruit. The pastry is brushed with lightly beaten egg whites, baked, and garnished with nuts.

Linzer torte is a holiday treat in the Austrian, Czech, Swiss, German, and Tirolean traditions, often eaten at Christmas. Some North American bakeries offer Linzer torte as small tarts or as cookies.

Linzer cookies ("Linzer eyes") or Linzer tarts are a sandwich cookie version, topped with a layer of dough with a characteristic circle shaped cut-out exposing the fruit preserves, and dusted with confectioner's sugar.

History
The Linzer torte is said to be the oldest cake ever to be named after a place. For a long time, the recipe from 1696 in the Vienna Stadt- und Landesbibliothek was the oldest one known. In 2005, however, Waltraud Faißner, the library director of the Upper Austrian Landesmuseum and author of the book Wie mann die Linzer Dortten macht ("How to make the Linzer Torte"), found an even older Veronese recipe from 1653 in Codex 35/31 in the archive of Admont Abbey.

The invention of the Linzer torte is subject of numerous legends, claiming either a Viennese confectioner named Linzer (as given by Alfred Polgar) or the Franconian pastry chef Johann Konrad Vogel (1796–1883), who started mass production of the cake in Linz around 1823.

The Austrian migrant Franz Hölzlhuber claimed to have introduced the Linzer torte to Milwaukee in the 1850s.

See also
 Empire biscuit

References

Further reading
 Marshall Faye: Now that's a Linzertorte. Stowe, Vt. 2007, .

External links
 

Hungarian desserts
Fruit pies
Austrian pastries
Cookie sandwiches
Foods with jam
Christmas food